This list of Russian admirals includes the admirals of all ranks, serving in the Russian Imperial Navy, the Soviet Navy and the modern Russian Navy.

See also the categories :Category:Imperial Russian Navy admirals and :Category:Soviet admirals.

Alphabetical list


A

Pavel Sergeyevich Abankin, Admiral, Head of Naval Academy (1944), Deputy Navy Minister for Shipbuilding and Armaments, Head of the Hydrographic Directorate (1952-1958)
Abdulikhat Abassov, Rear admiral, (1929-1996), Head of Nuclear Submarine Training Center, Chief of Navy Combat Training
Vladimir Antonovich Alafuzov, Admiral, Chief of the Main Navy Staff, Soviet Navy
Vladimir Nikolayevich Alekseyev, Admiral, First Deputy Chief of the Main Navy Staff
Nikolay Nikolayevich Amelko, Admiral, Commander of the Pacific Fleet
Fyodor Apraksin, General admiral, won the Battle of Gangut during the Great Northern War, led the Russian Navy in the Russo-Persian War (1722–1723)
Sergey Iosifovich Avakyants, Admiral, Commander of the Pacific Fleet

B
Nikolai Efremovich Basistiy, Admiral, Commander of the Black Sea Fleet
Fabian Gottlieb von Bellingshausen, Admiral, notable participant of the First Russian circumnavigation, leader of another Russian circumnavigation during which he and his second-in-command Mikhail Lazarev discovered the continent of Antarctica
Aksel Ivanovich Berg, Admiral and scientist, major developer of radiolocation and cybernetics
Vladimir Ivanovich Bogdashin, rear admiral, captain of the frigate Bezzavetnyy during the 1988 Black Sea bumping incident
Ivan Botsis, Admiral in charge of the galley fleet under Peter the Great
Laskarina Bouboulina, Greek naval commander, heroine of the Greek War of Independence in 1821, and posthumously an admiral of the Imperial Russian Navy.

C

Andrei Trofimovich Chabanenko, admiral, Commander of the Northern Fleet
Vladimir Nikolayevich Chernavin, Fleet admiral, Commander of the Soviet Northern Fleet, the last Commander-in-Chief of the Soviet Navy, first and only Commander-in-Chief of the CIS Navy
Vasiliy Chichagov, Admiral, polar explorer,  won the battles of Öland, Reval  and Vyborg Bay, effectively bringing the Russo-Swedish War of 1788-90 to an end
Viktor Viktorovich Chirkov, Admiral, Commander of the Baltic Fleet (2009-2012), Commander-in-Chief of the Russian Navy (2012-2016)
Grigoriy Pavlovich Chukhnin, Vice admiral, commander of the Black Sea Fleet during the 1905 Russian Revolution and battleship Potemkin mutiny until his assassination in 1906.
Cornelius Cruys, Vice admiral, the first commander of the Russian Baltic Fleet

D

Fyodor Dubasov, Admiral, placed Port Arthur and Dalny under Russian control
Valentin Drozd, Vice admiral, commander of Baltic Fleet Squadron 1941–1943 and Northern Fleet 1938–1940
Nikolai Dimitrievich Dabić. Vice admiral, died in 1908 from wounds sustained in the Russo-Japanese War

E
Oskar Enqvist, Vice Admiral, Commander of the First Cruiser Division of the 2nd Pacific Squadron during the Russo-Japanese War
Arvid Adolf Etholén, Vice Admiral, explorer, Chief Manager of the Russian American Company 1840-1845.

F

Aleksandr Fedotenkov, Vice admiral, Commander of the Black Sea Fleet, deputy commander of the Navy
Baron Dmitry Gustavovich von Fölkersahm, Rear Admiral, Commander of the 2nd battle division of the 2nd Pacific Squadron. Died of cancer onboard battleship Oslyabya a few days before Battle of Tsushima

G

Lev Mikhailovich Galler, Admiral, Chief of the Main Navy Staff
Mikhail Mikhailovich Golitsyn, General Admiral from 1756 to 1762
Arseniy Grigoryevich Golovko, Admiral, Commander of the Northern Fleet
Sergey Georgiyevich Gorshkov, Fleet admiral of the Soviet Union (one of only three), led a number of landing operations in the Black Sea during World War II, the Commander-in-Chief of the Soviet Navy during most of the Cold War and for almost 30 years (1956-1985)
Samuel Greig, Admiral, won the Battle of Chesma during the Russo-Turkish War (1768-1774) and participated in the Battle of Hogland during the Russo-Swedish War (1788-1790)
Ivan Konstantinovich Grigorovich, Admiral, chief of Port Arthur's port during the siege of Port Arthur, Russia's last Naval Minister
Vladimir Vladimirovich Grishechkin, Rear Admiral, Chief of Staff/1st Deputy Commander of Northern Fleet
Feliks Nikolayevich Gromov, Fleet admiral, Commander-in-Chief of the Russian Navy, previously commander of the Northern Fleet
Thomas Gordon, (1658 -1741) Admiral, - Governor and Commander-in-Chief at Kronshtadt from  1727 until his death in 1741. His granddaughter Anne Young married a Scot,  Lt. Thomas MacKenzie (Foma Kalinovich Mekenzi, Фома Калинович Мекензи -Son of Colin). Two years after their marriage in 1738 they had a son also called Thomas, (Foma Fomich Mekenzi (Фома Фомич Мекензи - Son of Thomas),  A Scottish-Russian rear admiral who founded the city of Sevastopol in service of the Russian Empire in 1783.

I
Ivan Stepanovich Isakov, Fleet admiral of the Soviet Union (one of only three), served during World War II, Chief of the Main Navy Staff, oceanographer
Vladimir Ivanovich Istomin, Rear admiral, fought in the Battle of Navarino, hero of the siege of Sevastopol (1854–1855) during the Crimean War, died in action

J
John Paul Jones, Rear admiral, served in and achieved rank of Rear Admiral with the Black Sea Fleet after serving as a Captain in the American Navy during the American Revolution

K
Igor Vladimirovich Kasatonov, Admiral, Deputy Commander-in-Chief of the Russian Navy
Vladimir Afanasyevich Kasatonov, Fleet Admiral, First Deputy Commander-in-Chief of the Soviet Navy
Vladimir Lvovich Kasatonov, Vice-Admiral, head of the N. G. Kuznetsov Naval Academy
Mikhail Alexandrovich Kedrov, Vice admiral, who led White Russian forces, including the evacuation of Wrangel's fleet from the Crimea as the Russian Civil War came to a close
Mikhail Nikolayevich Khronopulo, Admiral, commander of the Black Sea Fleet between 1985 and 1991
Aleksandr Vasilyevich Kolchak, Admiral, polar explorer, commander of the Black Sea Fleet, a leader of the White movement during the Russian Civil War
Nikolay Kolomeytsev, Vice admiral, polar explorer, a hero of the Russo-Japanese War, later led White Russian naval forces in the Baltic during the Russian Civil War
Vladimir Konovalov, Rear admiral, distinguished submarine commander during World War II
Vladimir Alekseyevich Kornilov, Vice admiral, fought in the Battle of Navarino, hero of the siege of Sevastopol (1854–1855), died in the Battle of Malakoff
Vladimir Ivanovich Korolev, Admiral, Commander-in-Chief Russian Navy, Commander of Northern Fleet 
Nikolay Krabbe, Admiral and Naval Minister, co-founded the first Russian naval bases in Primorsky Krai, oversaw the development of naval artillery and ironclad ships
Nikolai Mikhailovich Kulakov, Vice admiral, political branch, Hero of the Soviet Union
Vladimir Ivanovich Kuroyedov, Fleet admiral, Commander-in-Chief of the Russian Navy
Nikolay Gerasimovich Kuznetsov, (1902-1974), Fleet admiral of the Soviet Union (one of only three), the Commander-in-Chief of the Soviet Navy during World War II (1939-1946)
Alexander Ivanovich Kruz (1731-1799), Fleet Admiral

L

Mikhail Petrovich Lazarev, Admiral, three times circumnavigator and discoverer of Antarctica, destroyed five enemy warships as a commander of Azov in the Battle of Navarino, tutor of Nakhimov, Kornilov and Istomin
Viktor Nikolayevich Liina, Vice Admiral, Chief of Staff/1st Deputy Commander of Black Sea Fleet
Sergey Vladimrovich Lipilin, Rear Admiral, Deputy Commander Black Sea Fleet
Semyon Mikhailovich Lobov, Fleet admiral, Commander of the Northern Fleet

M

Thomas Mackenzie (Foma Kalinovich Mekenzi, Фома Калинович Мекензи (Russian admiral) (1710–1766), Rear admiral,  Entered Russian Navy in 1736 at Archangel. Father of Rear Admiral Thos MacKenzie founder of Sebastopol
Thomas Mackenzie,(1740–1786), Rear admiral, Founder of Sevastopol 1783  first Commander-in-Chief of the Black Sea Fleet.  Awarded Knight Order of St.George IV Class for his  bravery in successfully   navigating a fireship into the enemy which contributed to the destruction of the Turkish Fleet in the Russo/Turkish War at Chesma 5–7 July 1770
 Konstantin Valentinovich Makarov, (1931-2011), Fleet Admiral, Chief of the Main Navy Staff/First Deputy Commander-in-Chief of the Navy
Stepan Osipovich Makarov, Vice admiral, inventor and explorer, performed the first ever successful torpedo attack (during the Russo-Turkish War of 1877–1878), built the first torpedo boat tender and the first polar icebreaker, author of the insubmersibility theory, killed in the Russo-Japanese War when his ship struck a naval mine
Nikolai Mikhailovich Maksimov, Admiral, Commander of the Northern Fleet, head of the Naval Academy
Pavel Maksutov, Rear admiral, hero of the Battle of Sinop and the siege of Sevastopol (1854–1855)
Viktor Mardusin, Vice Admiral, Commander of the Baltic Fleet
Nikolai Ilych Martynyuk (1934-2021), Vice Admiral, First Deputy Chief of Staff of the Pacific Fleet 
 Vladimir Petrovich Maslov, (1925-1989), Admiral, Commander of the Pacific Fleet (1974-1979)Vladimir Vasilyevich Masorin, Fleet admiral, Commander-in-Chief of the Russian Navy
 Aleksandr Danilovich Menshikov, (1673-1729), Admiral, close associate of Peter I (the Great) active in early Russian naval battlesVladimir Vasilyevich Mikhailin, Admiral, Commander of the Baltic Fleet
 Arkadiy Petrovich Mikhailovskiy, Admiral, Commander of Northern Fleet (1981-1984)Aleksandr Alekseyevich Moiseyev, Vice admiral, commander of the Black Sea FleetMikhail Vasilyevich Motsak, Vice admiral, Chief of Staff/1st Deputy Commander of the Northern FleetIgor Timurbulatovich Mukhametshin, Vice Admiral, Chief of Staff/1st Deputy Commander of Baltic Fleet

NPavel Stepanovich Nakhimov, Admiral, circumnavigated the world with Mikhail Lazarev, fought in the Battle of Navarino, annihilated the Ottoman fleet in the Battle of Sinope, commander and hero at the siege of Sevastopol (1854–1855)Charles Henry of Nassau-Siegen, Admiral, won several battles during the Russo-Turkish War (1787–1792) and was defeated in the Battle of Svensksund in the Russo-Swedish War (1788–1790)
 Petr Nikolayevich Navoytsev, (1920-1993), Admiral, First Deputy Chief of the Main Navy Staff (1975-1988)
 Gennadiy Ivanovich Nevelskoy, (1813-1876), Admiral, prominent explorer of the Far EastAleksandr Mikhailovich Nosatov, Admiral, Commander Baltic Fleet

OAleksey Grigoryevich Orlov, Commander of the Russian fleet during the Russo-Turkish War of 1768–1774, victor of the Battle of ChesmaFilipp Sergeyevich Oktyabrskiy (Ivanov), Admiral, Commander of the Black Sea Fleet, a leader of defence in the siege of Sevastopol (1941–1942)Aleksandr Yevstafyevich Orel, Admiral, Commander of the Baltic FleetIgor Vladimirovich Osipov, Admiral, Commander of the Black Sea Fleet

PYuriy Aleksandrovich Panteleyev, Admiral, Commander of the Pacific FleetPavel Pereleshin, Rear admiral, hero of the Battle of Sinop and the siege of Sevastopol (1854–1855)Aleksandr Igorevich Peshkov, rear admiral, Commander of Caspian FlotillaIgor Nikolayevich Petrov, rear admiral, political branchSergey Mikhailovich Pinchuk, Vice Admiral, Commander of Caspian FlotillaVasiliy Ivanovich Platonov, Admiral, Commander of the Northern FleetAndrey Popov, Admiral, hero of the Crimean War, led a Russian flotilla to support the Union during the American Civil War, designed the first true Russian battleship Pyotr Velikiy

RYuri Rall, Vice admiral, Second World War, Soviet evacuation of Tallinn, siege of LeningradAnatoliy Ivanovich Rassokho, Admiral, Head of Defense Ministry Main Directorate of Navigation and OceanographyMikhail Reyneke, Vice admiral, major 19th century hydrographerJosé de Ribas, Vice admiral, founder of Odessa, hero of the siege of IzmailPyotr Ricord, Admiral, Head of the Russian Navy squadrons blockaded the Dardanelles during the Russo-Turkish War (1828-1829), participated in the Civil conflict in Greece (1831–1833), and defended Kronstadt (1854) during the Crimean War (1853–1856)Grand Duke Alexey Alexandrovich (Romanov), General admiral and Naval Minister during the Russo-Japanese WarGrand Duke Konstantin Nikolayevich (Romanov), General admiral and statesman, oversaw the rapid transition of the Russian Navy to ironclad warshipsZinoviy Petrovich Rozhestvenskiy, Vice Admiral, commander of the 2nd Pacific Squadron during the Russo-Japanese War, wounded in the Battle of TsushimaAndrey Vladimirovich Ryabukhin, Rear Admiral, Deputy Commander of Pacific Fleet

SNaum Akimovich Senyavin, Vice admiral, won the Battle of Osel during the Great Northern WarAleksey Naumovich Senyavin, re-established the Don Military Flotilla and played a crucial role in Russia's gaining access to the Black SeaDmitriy Nikolayevich Senyavin, Admiral, won the battles of the Dardanelles and Athos against Ottomans during the Napoleonic WarsNikolay Dmitriyevich Sergeyev, Fleet admiral, Chief of the Main Navy Staff/First Deputy Commander-in-Chief of the Soviet Navy
 Peter von Sivers (1674-1740) chaired the Russian Admiralty Board in 1728-32.Nikolai Ivanovich Smirnov, Fleet admiral, Commander of the Pacific FleetViktor Nikolayevich Sokolov, Vice Admiral, Deputy Commander of Northern FleetEmil Nikolayevich Spiridonov (1925-1981), Commander of the Pacific FleetGrigoriy Andreyevich Spiridov, Admiral, destroyed the Ottoman fleet in the Battle of Chesma during the Russo-Turkish War (1768-1774)Georgy Andreyevich Stepanov, vice admiral, commander during the Second World War
Ivan Ivanovich Stronskiy, Kontr Admiral , (1846 - 1901), famous in Russian - Turkish war 1877-1878, also followed the Order of service to Duke of Edinburgh Alfred in 1876.

TAleksandr Arkadevich Tatarinov, Admiral, commanded the Russian Black Sea Fleet, First Deputy Commander-in-Chief of the Russian Navy. Jean de Traversay, Admiral, commanded the Russian Black Sea Fleet and Russian Baltic Fleet, organised early Russian circumnavigationsVladimir Filippovich Tributs, Admiral, commander of the Soviet Baltic Fleet during the siege of Leningrad, led the Soviet evacuation of Tallinn

UFyodor Fyodorovich Ushakov, the most illustrious Russian Admiral of the 18th century, saint, won the battles of Fidonisi, Kerch Strait, Tendra and Cape Kaliakra during the Russo-Turkish War (1787–1792), single-handedly carved out the Greek Septinsular Republic, did not lose a single ship in 43 battles

VValery Vladimirovich Varfolomeyev, rear admiral, submarine officer, commander of the 11th Submarine DivisionViktor Konstantinovich Vasilyev, rear admiral, academic of the Naval AcademyNikolai Ignatevich Vinogradov, admiral, submarine officer, commander of the Kamchatka FlotillaAleksandr Viktorovich Vitko, Admiral, Deputy Commander-in-Chief Russian NavyAndrei Olgertovich Volozhinsky, Vice Admiral, Chief of Staff/1st Deputy CinC Russian Navy Vladimir Sergeyevich Vysotsky, Admiral, Commander-in-Chief of the Russian NavyMarko Ivanovich Vojnović, one of the founders of the Black Sea Fleet.

YNikolay Yuryevich Yakubovskiy, Rear Admiral, Chief of Staff/1st Deputy Commander of Caspian FlotillaVladimir Anatolyevich Yakushev, Rear Admiral, Commander of the Primorsky FlotillaNikolai Pavlovich Yegipko, Vice admiral, Hero of the Soviet UnionGeorgiy Mikhailovich Yegorov, Fleet admiral, Commander of the Northern Fleet
 Vladimir Grigoryevich Yegorov, Admiral, Commander Russian Baltic Fleet 
 Oleg Aleksandrovich Yerofeyev, Admiral, Commander of Northern FleetNikolay Anatolyevich Yevmenov, Admiral, Commander of Northern Fleet, Commander in Chief of the NavyIvan Stepanovich Yumashev, Admiral, reclaimed Southern Sakhalin and Kuril Islands for the USSR during the Soviet–Japanese War, Commander-in-Chief of the Soviet Navy in the late 1940s

ZMikhail Nikolayevich Zakharov, admiral, political commissarVasiliy Stepanovich Zavoyko, fought in the Battle of Navarino, twice circumnavigated the globe, explored the estuary of the Amur River, repelled the superior British-French forces in the siege of Petropavlovsk during the Crimean WarMatija Zmajević''', Vice admiral, hero of the battles of Gangut and Grengam during the Great Northern War

See also
Russian Admiralty

References

 
 
Admirals
Russian